Anthony James Barr (born September 24, 1940), aka Tony Barr or Jim Barr, is an American  programming language designer, software engineer and inventor.  Among his notable contributions are the Statistical Analysis System (SAS), automated lumber yield optimization, and the Automated Classification of Medical Entities (ACME).

Contributions

Statistical Analysis System (SAS) 
Widely used internationally in science, government, industry, and academia, the SAS System was founded by Barr in 1966.  In September 1966, in Athens, Georgia, he presented the conceptual ideas of SAS to members of the Committee on Statistical Software of the University Statisticians of the Southern Experiment Stations (USSES).

Barr had earlier created an analysis-of-variance modeling language inspired by the notation of statistician Maurice Kendall.  He developed it in assembly language on the IBM 1410, as a graduate student at North Carolina State University from 1962 to 1963.  Dr. A. Grandage, author of IBM 650 analysis-of-variance programs, advised on some of the statistical computations. This was followed by a multiple regression program with a flexible input format and with algebraic transformation of variables, in 1963 to 1964. Drawing on those programs, along with his experience with structured data files, he created SAS, placing statistical procedures into a formatted file framework.

Barr's experience with structured data files was gained while working on the Formatted File System, (see below).  From 1966 to 1968, Barr developed the fundamental structure and language of SAS.

In 1968, Barr began collaboration with others.  Barr designed and implemented the programming language, data management, report writing, and systems areas of the evolving system.  In 1976,  SAS Institute, Inc. was incorporated by Anthony J. Barr, James H. Goodnight, John P. Sall, and Jane T. Helwig, with Barr holding the largest share (40%).  He sold his shares in 1979.

Automated Classification of Medical Entities (ACME) 
Barr created the ACME program for the National Center for Health Statistics from 1967 to 1969.  ACME is a computer program that assigns one underlying cause of death based on multiple causes of death listed on the death certificate.

ACME in conjunction with other components comprise the Mortality Medical Data System (MMDS).  This system is used to uniformly determine underlying cause of death for all death certificates in the United States.  ACME has become the de facto international standard for the automated selection of the underlying cause of death.  It and the other components of MMDS, or variations of them are used in many nations around the world.  The system provides essential data used in calculating mortality statistics.

Automated Lumber Yield Optimization 
In 1971 and 1972, Barr, along with partner Sandy Mullin designed, patented, and built the first computerized equipment to optimize the usage of lumber in the furniture industry.  The device read marked flaws on a board, calculated the cross and rip cuts required for optimal board usage, and marked the cut lines on the board.

In 1973, Barr-Mullin, Inc. was incorporated, and its lumber yield optimization technology remains widely used in the American wood industry.

Linking Loader for the IBM/360 
In 1968, Barr created the first non-IBM linking loader for the IBM/360.  Named LDR, the loader was sponsored by American Data Processing Inc. of Raleigh, North Carolina.  The Barr Loader cut typical program testing times by twenty-five percent.

IBM did not offer the equivalent Loader for over eighteen months after the Barr Loader was commercially available.

IBM Workstation Simulators 
In 1971, Barr created the first non-IBM HASP terminal emulator.  Marketed by the University Computing Company (UCC), the HASP emulator gave a significant performance increase over the IBM 2780 emulator he had developed for UCC in 1969.  The emulators were developed on the PDP-8 minicomputer and allowed COPE terminals to communicate with the IBM/360 and IBM/370.

In 1971, Barr also implemented the HASP workstation for M & M Computer Industries, Orange, California.  Implemented on the Data General Nova minicomputer, the program became the Singer Corporation Remote Batch Terminal. Both Singer and UCC sold their terminal divisions to Harris Corporation, which continued to market the products.

In 1983, Barr developed hardware and software for performing HASP remote job entry communication on the IBM PC.  His company, Barr Systems, Inc., marketed and sold Barr HASP, and went on to implement and support Bisync and SNA SDLC workstations and gateways, along with other data communications and output management products.

Formatted File System (FFS) 
Barr was employed with IBM Federal Systems Division at the Pentagon, Washington, D.C. from 1964 to 1966.  There he worked on the NIPS Formatted File System.  FFS, a generalized data base management system for retrieval and report writing, was one of the first data management systems to take advantage of defined file structure for data storage and retrieval efficiency.

Assigned to work with the National Military Command Center, the information processing branch of the Joint Chiefs of Staff, Barr rewrote and enhanced FFS, implementing three of its five major components: retrieval, sorting, and file update.  His work featured the innovation of a uniform lexical analyzer for all languages in the system with a uniform method of handling all error messages.

Working with FFS introduced Barr to the potential of the defined file structure, which was to become a central concept of SAS (above).

Patents, publications, and education

Patents
 Barr, Tony, Satisfaction Metrics and Methods of Implementation, 8,380,560, 2-19-2013, Cl. 705-7.38.
 Barr, Anthony J. and Mullin, Alexander G., Apparatus and method for maximizing utilization of elongated stock. 4,017,976, 4-19-1977, Cl. 235-151.l.
 Barr, Anthony J. and Mullin, Alexander G., Apparatus for optimizing the yield of usable pieces from boards and the like. 3,942,021, 3-2-76, Cl. 250-572.000.
 Barr, Anthony J. and Mullin, Alexander G., Apparatus and method for optimizing the yield of usable pieces from boards and the like. 3,931,501, 1-6-76, Cl. 235-151.100.

Publications

Personal life and career
Barr was born in New York City and grew up in Summit, New Jersey, where he graduated from Summit High School in 1958.
Growing up, he was inspired by the biographies of Ben Franklin, Marconi, Alexander Graham Bell, Wright Brothers, and Sikorsky as well as visits to the Franklin Institute in Philadelphia and the Museum of Natural History in New York City. In 2021, Barr and his wife Olga donated $1M to the Cade Museum for Creativity and Invention to support the museum’s youth programming.

Education
 BS in Applied Physics (with honors), North Carolina State University, 1962.
 MS in Physics, North Carolina State University, 1968.
 1963 National Science Foundation Fellowship to study physical oceanography at Woods Hole Oceanographic Institution.
 1963 National Science Foundation Graduate Fellowship at North Carolina State University.
 1995 Distinguished Alumnus, North Carolina State University, College of Physical and Mathematical Sciences.

See also 
 Terminal emulator
 Linking loader

Notes

References
 
 Barr, Anthony J. (2006), Professional History
 Barr, Anthony J. (2006), SAS History
 Barr, Anthony J. (2010), SAS Beginnings
 
 
 
 
 
 
 National Center for Health Statistics About the Mortality Medical Data System
 North Carolina State University, College of Physical and Mathematical Sciences, Distinguished Alumni

External links 
 Barr-Mullin, Inc.
 Barr Systems, Inc.
 National Center for Health Statistics
 North Carolina State University
 College of Physical and Mathematical Sciences.
 Distinguished Alumnus
 SAS Institute

1940 births
Living people
American inventors
Programming language designers
American software engineers
Businesspeople in timber
American computer businesspeople
Businesspeople in software
Businesspeople in information technology
Engineers from New York (state)
People from Summit, New Jersey
Summit High School (New Jersey) alumni
Engineers from New Jersey